Dakila Carlo 'Dax' Enriquez Cua is a Filipino politician who currently serves as the governor of the province of Quirino. He also served as vice governor and a member of the House of the Representatives from the Lone District of Quirino. Aside from his official work as a legislator, he is the Spokesperson and Ambassador of TAO - Trabaho at Opportunidad, a joint effort of public and private sector leaders to contribute to the provision of jobs and opportunities for the Filipino people.

Public service 

Dax, as he is more popularly known, started his career in public service at the age of 23. In 2001, he was elected as Vice Governor of the Province of Quirino becoming the youngest Vice Governor of the country at that time. In 2004, he won a second term as Vice Governor and continued to promote the interests of the youth to participate in the development of the province. His flagship program as Vice Governor, Movement for the Integrated Development of the Youth (MIDY) was aimed at developing the holistic well-being of the youth through scholarship programs, leadership seminars, academic contests, and sporting activities.

In 2007, Dax ran and won as Governor of Quirino. As a governor, he prioritized education, health, livelihood, and infrastructure. After years of serving the province as Vice Governor, Dax observed that majority of the problems faced by the province can be traced back to the lack of jobs and opportunities. Before providing jobs and opportunities, it was necessary to improve the education and health of the people so that they can be productive. Infrastructure was also critical so that the goods and services of the province can be delivered to markets.

As a governor, he is best remembered for launching I ❤️ Quirino, a campaign to encourage Quirinians to take pride of their province. As part of the I ❤️ Quirino, Dax regularly spent half of his time visiting each of the 132 barangays of the province. During each visit, he would bring the services of the Provincial Capitol with him. These included health and dental services, on-the-spot repair of unpaved roads, and other forms of assistance. Through his persistence in reaching out to every Quirinian, he was able to visit each barangay multiple times in a year.

Aside from I ❤️ Quirino, Dax launched Q LIFE or Quirino Livelihood for Everyone during his time as Governor. The program has two components: Rural Improvement Clubs and Livelihood Support. To kickstart micro entrepreneurship in the province, Dax supported the establishment of a Rural Improvement Club in every barangay. The women of each barangay organized themselves into a Rural Improvement Club that provided micro loans to their members for livelihood projects. They elected their own set of officers and established their own rules. The Provincial Government provided the clubs with seed money and audits the performance of each club annually so as to help them improve the management of their funds. To further assist the clubs, the Provincial Government coordinated with the Department of Trade and Industry for the provision of Shared Services Facilities (SSF), equipment that they use for their livelihood projects. Examples of successful livelihood projects funded through a Rural Improvement Club include processed foods such as fruit wine, vegetable chicharon, smoked fish, and longganisa.

Under Q LIFE, Quirinians could also apply for Livelihood Support. They undergo an application process and are equipped with working capital and technical knowledge before they proceed with their livelihood project. Some examples of projects supported by Q LIFE include fish pens and corn planting.

In 2010, Dax became the Representative of the Lone District of Quirino. During his three terms as congressman, he continued supporting the programs he initiated when he was Governor. He also continued to prioritize education and is the principal author of RA 10230, which established Quirino State University (QSU) by integrating Quirino State College (QSC), Quirino Polytechnic College (QPC), and Maddela Institute of Technology (MIT).

He finished elementary and secondary education at Xavier School in Greenhills. He graduated from the University of the Philippines with a degree in Business Administration.

Dax Cua comes from a family of politicians.  His father, Junie E. Cua, and his mother, Ma. Angela E. Cua, were former Representatives of the lone district of Quirino.

Personal life 
He is the eldest son of Junie E. Cua and Ma. Angela E. Cua. Junie E. Cua is the current Governor of Quirino and previously served as its Representative for 20 years from 1987 to 1998 and from 2001 to 2010.

Dax has been married since 2011 and has three children.

In an interview, he said that his nickname caused giggles on Visayan representatives, but never got offended.

Education 
Dax finished elementary and secondary education at Xavier School in Greenhills. He graduated from the University of the Philippines with a degree in Business Administration.

References 

Living people
Year of birth missing (living people)
Place of birth missing (living people)
Governors of Quirino
Members of the House of Representatives of the Philippines from Quirino
University of the Philippines alumni